Pradhan Mantri Awas Yojana (PMAY) is an initiative by the Government of India in which affordable housing will be provided to the urban poor with a target of building 2 crore (20 million) affordable houses by 31 March 2022. It has two components: Pradhan Mantri Awas Yojana (Urban) (PMAY-U) for the urban poor and Pradhan Mantri Awaas Yojana (Gramin) (PMAY-G and also PMAY-R) for the rural poor. This scheme is converged with other schemes to ensure houses have a toilet, Saubhagya Yojana electricity connection, Ujjwala Yojana LPG connection, access to drinking water and Jan Dhan banking facilities, etc. Total 1 crore homes are approved against total demand of 1.12 crore as of 28 December 2019.

History

Public housing programme in India started with the rehabilitation of refugees immediately after independence. Till 1960, nearly five lakh families were provided houses in different parts of Northern India. In 1957, within the ambit of the second five-year plan of Prime Minister Nehru, Village Housing Programme (VHP) was introduced providing loans to individuals and cooperatives of up to ₹5,000 per unit. Only 67,000 houses could be constructed in this scheme till end of the fifth Five Year Plan (1974–1979). Another scheme introduced in the fourth called House Sites-cum-Construction Assistance Scheme (HSCAS) was also transferred to the State Sector from 1974 to 1975.

With the launch of Indira Awas Yojana (IAY) by the then Prime Minister Rajiv Gandhi in 1985, the public housing programme in India got a boost. IAY was launched as a rural housing programme targeting SC/ST and Minority population. The programme was gradually extended to cover all Below Poverty Line (BPL) population.

As a part of the continuous efforts of the Indian Government to fulfill the housing needs of rural and urban poor, Pradhan Mantri Awaas Yojana was launched by Prime Minister Narendra Modi in June 2015 with an aim to provide affordable housing.

Under the Pradhan Mantri Awas Yojana, a subsidy of ₹2.67 lakh is provided by the government on the interest of home loan for buying a house. The Uttar Pradesh Housing Development Council will provide houses at affordable rates under the Pradhan Mantri Awas Yojana. Applications have been sought under this scheme for about 3,516 houses in Uttar Pradesh. The booking for which starts from 1 September 2020 and the last date of booking is 15 October 2020. These houses are located in 19 cities of the state of Uttar Pradesh. People from poor families will be able to buy these houses for only ₹3.5 lakh. All those people whose annual income is less than ₹3 lakh are eligible to apply for these houses. The Uttar Pradesh Housing Development Council had earlier kept the repayment time of the house up to 5 years, which has been changed to 3 years.

Indira Awas Yojana or IAY is one of the first centralised housing schemes for Indians. It was introduced by the then Prime Minister, Rajiv Gandhi, in 1985. The scheme’s primary objective was to provide housing for the economically weaker sections in the country, and individuals belonging to below the poverty line or BPL. At first, its benefits were exclusive to beneficiaries from the Scheduled Caste and Scheduled Tribe minority groups. However, as of 2016, 
IAY was officially merged with the Pradhan Mantri Awas Yojana Gramin scheme.

The scheme
The features of Pradhan Mantri Awas Yojana are that the government will provide an interest subsidy of 6.5% (for EWS and LIG), 4% for MIG-I and 3% for MIG-II on housing loans availed by the beneficiaries for a period of 20 years under credit link subsidy scheme (CLSS) from the start of a loan. The houses under Pradhan Mantri Awas Yojana would be constructed through a technology that is eco-friendly, while allotting ground floors in any housing scheme under PMAY, preference will be given to differently abled and older persons.

Finance

Eligibility criteria
Condition for PMAY:

(a) Beneficiary max age 70 years.

(b) EWS (Economic Weaker Section) family income limit is ₹3 lakhs per annum and for LIG (Lower Income Group) Family Income limit is ₹6 Lakhs per annum, and Middle Income Group -(MIG-I) income between ₹6 lakhs to ₹12 lakhs per annum, (MIG-II) income between ₹12 lakhs to ₹18 lakhs per annum.

c) The beneficiary should not have an own dwelling unit on the name of any family member in any part of India.

d) The loan applicant should not have availed any central/state government subsidy or benefit for buying a home under the PMAY scheme.

e) Currently, the loan applicant should not own any property under their name and along with any of the family members (including the dependents).

f) The home renovation or improvement loans, self-construction loans will be allocated only for EWS and LIG categories.

The houses given under this scheme will be owned by females or jointly with males.

How to apply for the PMAY scheme?

Interested applicants can apply for the PMAY scheme online or offline. The online application process involves visiting the PMAY website and submitting the application form. The offline application process involves visiting the nearest Common Service Centre (CSC) or bank and submitting the application form.

Phases
3 Phases of PMAY envisage starting and completing the house construction work as follows:

 PMAY Phase-1 from April 2015 to March 2017 to cover 100 cities.
 PMAY Phase-2 from April 2017 to March 2019 to cover additional 200 cities. 
 PMAY Phase-3 from April 2019 to March 2021 to cover the remaining cities.

States and cities covered
As of 25 April 2016, the government has identified 2,508 cities and towns in 26 states for beginning construction of houses for urban poor. Construction of 1,86,777 additional houses for the benefit of urban poor with an investment of ₹11,169 cr with central assistance of ₹2,797 cr was approved in February 2018, taking the cumulative total houses approved to 39,25,240 houses including subsumed RAY scheme, of the targeted 1 crore houses by March 2022.
 Chhattisgarh – 1,000 cities/towns
 Jammu and Kashmir – 19 cities/towns
 Jharkhand – 15 cities/towns
 Madhya Pradesh – 74 cities/towns
 Rajasthan
 Haryana, 53,290 houses in 38 cities and towns with an investment of ₹4,322 crore (c. Feb 2018)
 Tamil Nadu, 40,623 houses in 65 cities and towns with an investment of ₹2,314 crore (c. Feb 2018)
 Karnataka, 32,656 houses in 95 cities with an investment of ₹1,461 crore (c. Feb 2018)
 Gujarat, 15,584 houses in 45 cities and towns with an investment of ₹946 crore (c. Feb 2018)
 Maharashtra, 12,123 houses in 13 cities and towns with an investment of ₹868 crore (c. Feb 2018)
 Kerala, 9,461 houses in 52 cities with an investment of ₹284 crore (c. Feb 2018)
 Uttarakhand, 6,226 houses in 57 cities and towns with an investment of ₹258 crore (c. Feb 2018)
 Orissa, 5,133 houses in 26 cities and towns with an investment of ₹156 crore (c. Feb 2018)
 West Bengal 7,682 houses in 17 cities and towns with an investment of ₹318 crore (c. Feb 2018)

Private contributors
IIFL Home Loans have been helping beneficiaries avail Credit linked Subsidy under Pradhan Mantri Awas Yojana across the country. Till 17 August 2017, the company has helped 4187 beneficiaries avail government subsidy. ICICI Bank is giving subsidised home loans to the people eligible for this scheme. AU Housing Finance Limited is also doing subsidy based funding under this scheme. Home First Finance company also provide help beneficiaries to avail Credit linked Subsidy under Pradhan Mantri Awas Yojana across different regions of India.

"Rajiv Awas Yojana (RAY)" was an Indian government program that attempts to help slum dwellers gain appropriate housing and address the processes by which slums are created and reproduced. It was introduced by the Indian government's Ministry of Housing and urban poverty Alleviation. The programme was a Centrally Sponsored Scheme, which ran from 2013 to 2014. The scheme aimed to make India slum-free by 2022 by providing people with shelter or housing, free of cost. It began with a pilot project, before launching in mission mode. The government earmarked  for its implementation during India's 12th Five Year Plan. One million beneficiaries were proposed to be covered under Rajiv Awas Yojana.

Site selection was to be made by the states in consultation with the Centre giving priority to district headquarters, cities of religious heritage and tourist importance, with due consideration to the criterion of the pace of growth of the city, of slums within the city and predominance of Scheduled Caste, Scheduled Tribe and minority population and other weaker and vulnerable section of the society. SBI has now slashed down the interest rate of home loans above 75 lakh by 10 basis points. From June 15, 2017, the rate for the same will be 8.55-8.6%.

What is the difference between PMAY (Urban) and PMAY (Rural)? 
PMAY (Urban) targets the urban poor, whereas PMAY (Rural) targets people living in rural areas. PMAY (Urban) scheme has four components, whereas PMAY (Rural) scheme has three components. The subsidy amount and the eligibility criteria are also different for both schemes.

See also 

 DigiLocker (easier access to online identity proof and services)
 Har ghar jal (water connection for each house)
 One Nation, One Ration Card (food security card's national portability)
 Saubhagya electrification scheme (electrification of all houses)
 Swachh Bharat (toilet for all houses)
 Ujjwala Yojana (clean cooking gas connections for all)

References

External links
 pmaymis.gov.in Official site

Housing in India
Modi administration initiatives
Ministry of Urban Development
2015 establishments in India
Government schemes in India